Trinity Presbyterian Church may refer to:

in Australia
Trinity Presbyterian Church in Camberwell, Victoria, a church associated with The Fellowship group in Australia

in the United States
Trinity Presbyterian Church (Charlottesville, Virginia)
Trinity Presbyterian Church (Montgomery, Alabama)
Trinity Presbyterian Church (San Francisco, California), listed on the National Register of Historic Places and a San Francisco Designated Landmark
Trinity Presbyterian Church (Tucson, Arizona)

See also
Trinity Church, Barrow-in-Furness, England, formerly a Presbyterian church